Trading Snakeoil for Wolftickets is the second studio album by Gary Jules on the Sanctuary Records label. Despite the year of release, it took three years to chart in both the UK and US, eventually reaching the UK Top 40 and Billboard 200 in 2004. The popular Tears for Fears cover "Mad World", which was featured on the Donnie Darko soundtrack and in the Gears of War trailer, is on the album.

Track listing

Personnel
Gary Jules – vocals, guitars, mandolin, harmonica
Michael Andrews – guitars, bass, vocals, piano, keyboards, melodica, drums, percussion
Sarah Brysk – vocals
Robert Walter – piano
Al Sgro – vocals
George Sluppick – drums (tracks 2 and 9)
Matt Lynott – drums (tracks 1 and 11)

Chart performance

References

External links
Lyrics for Gary Jules Songs (Songmeanings.net)

2001 albums
Gary Jules albums
Sanctuary Records albums